Dish of the Day is the third album by the German rock band Fool's Garden. Released in 1995, the most notable song is the international hit "Lemon Tree".

Track listing
All lyrics written by Peter Freudenthaler and Volker Hinkel, except "Finally" by Hinkel and Claus-Dieter Wissler.

Musicians
Peter Freudenthaler - vocals
Volker Hinkel - guitars, backing vocals, programming
Roland Röhl - keyboards
Thomas Mangold - bass
Rafl Wochele - drums, backing vocals
Gitte Haus, Tina Müller, Julia Noch and Karin Buck (formerly known as Karin Rossow) - backing vocals

Charts

Weekly charts

Year-end charts

Singles
Wild Days (1st version)
Lemon Tree
Wild Days (re-release)
Pieces

Certifications

References

1995 albums
Fools Garden albums
Intercord albums